St Germans railway station serves the village of St Germans in Cornwall, England. To the east of the station, the thirteen arch stone viaduct of 1908 (which replaced the original timber one built in 1859) takes the railway over the River Tiddy.

History 
The station opened with the Cornwall Railway on 4 May 1859. It was described at the time as"of ornamental design ... conveniently situated close to the town, and consists of arrival, departure, and goods stations, all three being constructed of stone".The Cornwall Railway was amalgamated into the Great Western Railway on 1 July 1889. On 1 January 1948, the Great Western Railway was nationalised, amalgamating with other railways to form British Rail, which was privatised in the 1990s.

The other building has been private accommodation since 1992; a number of camping coaches in the old sidings are available to let.

Accidents and incidents 
A fatal accident occurred near St Germans just two days after the opening of the railway. On 6 May 1859, the 7.25 p.m. train from Plymouth was approaching St Germans when the engine left the rails, hit the parapet of the wooden viaduct across Grove Creek and fell 38 feet into the mud below, landing upside down; two of the coaches also ended up in the creek. The driver, fireman, and one of the guards were killed. A second guard, Richard Paddon, was given a reward of five pounds for his part in keeping the remainder of the train on the viaduct and helping to rescue the survivors.

Facilities 
Both platforms have step-free entrances (though the footbridge linking them has steps) and basic facilities - waiting shelters, bike racks and bench seats on each side. Running information is provided by timetable posters and a public telephone. No ticket machine is available, so passengers must buy tickets prior to travel or on the train.

Services 
Sunday trains also call here, but on an irregular frequency with sizable gaps at certain times of day.

References 

Railway stations in Cornwall
Former Great Western Railway stations
Railway stations in Great Britain opened in 1859
Railway stations served by Great Western Railway
Isambard Kingdom Brunel railway stations
DfT Category F2 stations